J. exigua may refer to:

 Jaminia exigua, a sea snail
 Janthina exigua, a violet snail
 Jardinella exigua, a freshwater snail